Indigo Publications is a French company that publishes 4 news websites, mostly dedicated to specialized business sectors.

History
Indigo Publications was established in Paris in 1981. Founder Maurice Botbol assembled a small team of investigative journalists dedicated to economic news. Botbol serves as director of Indigo Publications and was President of the Syndicat presse indépendante d' information en ligne (Union of the Independent Press Information Online). Indigo is a French media group serving a global audience, but hangs its credibility on remaining editorially independent: as Botbol explains, "We are not culturally partisan, either toward France's interests nor those of the third world.... We are very careful not to have any 'national' positioning."

The Indian Ocean Newsletter was the first Indigo publication, focused on the business interests of East and southern Africa and the Indian Ocean states. Over the years, the company launched other regional titles including the economic newsletter for Francophone Africa, La Lettre du Continent (and its English equivalent, West Africa Newsletter); the North African newspaper Maghreb Confidential; and more specialized business publications like Africa Mining Intelligence and Intelligence Online. In 2007, Indigo acquired La Lettre A, a newsletter established in 1978 that specializes in news and analysis of politics and business in France. In April 2011, Indigo launched an online spinoff of La Lettre A called Entourages.

The company functions as a SAS (sociétés par actions simplifiées), with headquarters in Paris in the rue Montmartre.

Value-added tax audit controversy
On December 16, 2013, Indigo Publications and another French digital publisher, Mediapart, were audited by the French Inland Revenue Service over Value-added tax (VAT). The VAT rate for online news was 19.6% (20% starting in 2014), while that of traditional media was 2.1%, a disparity that had been in place since 2009. The companies contested the higher rate, and on January 31, 2015, in a ruling opposed by the European Commission, but consistent with the jurisprudence of the Court of Justice of the European Union, the French Budget Ministry issued taxing instructions, and a law was unanimously adopted by the National Assembly on February 4, and by the Senate on February 17, 2014, granting equality of tax treatment between traditional print and digital press.

Publications

Indigo publishes six news websites and 16 specialized newsletters. Since 1995, Indigo Publications has implemented a digital development strategy, and went with all digital publication of Intelligence Online and all the company's Africa publications, on the Africa Intelligence website in April 2013. As of January 2016, all publications are now 100% digital.

Intelligence Online
Intelligence Online, formerly Intelligence Newsletter, reports on and analyses secret diplomacy, parallel operations and conflicts around the world, focusing on the role of government intelligence agencies, corporate intelligence firms and lobby groups.  It also investigates money-laundering, political instability, terrorism, espionage and organized crime in North America, Europe, the Middle East and Asia. Pierre Gastineau is the Editor-in-Chief.

The Indian Ocean Newsletter
The Indian Ocean Newsletter is a newsletter-style publication covering the business and economies of East Africa and the Indian Ocean states. It provides news and analysis of the region's business communities and economic affairs, as well as related political issues. The newsletter has been published fortnightly since 1981. Tristan Coloma is the editor-in-chief.

Africa Mining Intelligence
Africa Mining Intelligence is a specialist publication for the mining industry in Africa. Africa Mining Intelligence covers the mining business, reporting on deals in the sector, the business strategies of the key players and on the policies of governments and state-owned mining companies. It also provides detailed background information about the sector's movers and shakers. It has been published fortnightly since 2000. Louise Margolin is the Editor-in-Chief.

West Africa Newsletter
West Africa Newsletter, and its French-language version, La Lettre du Continent, are newsletter-style publications focused on business and economic affairs in French-speaking West and Central Africa. The newsletter covers the activities of the region's business communities, while its "Corridors of Power" section provides news and analysis of national and international politics. It has been published fortnightly since 1985. Philippe Vasset is the Editor-in-Chief. Its founder is the retired journalist Antoine Glaser.

Maghreb Confidential
Maghreb Confidential is a newsletter specializing in North African politics and business. It has been published each week since 1990. Maghreb Confidential provides news and expert analysis of the evolving economic, political and diplomatic situation in North Africa, examining the public and less visible activities of the most influential players in politics and business and reporting on the latest business negotiations and deals. Lazare Beullac is the Editor-in-Chief of Maghreb Confidential.

La Lettre A
La Lettre A is dedicated to the political, economic and media news in France. Marion Deye is the Editor-in-Chief of La Lettre A.

Notes

References

External links
 

Publishing companies of France
Newsletter publishing companies